Đurkovići is a village in the municipality of Podgorica, Montenegro.

The village is within the territorial boundaries of the Piperi tribe.

Demographics
According to the 2011 census, its population was 91.

References

Populated places in Podgorica Municipality